Pierre Fortier (November 15, 1932 – June 22, 2019) was a Canadian politician, who represented the electoral district of Outremont in the National Assembly of Quebec from 1980 to 1989. He was a member of the Quebec Liberal Party.

References

1932 births
2019 deaths
French Quebecers
Politicians from Montreal
Quebec Liberal Party MNAs